The Continental Cup 2013–14 was the 17th edition of the IIHF Continental Cup. The season has started on 27 September 2013, and finished on 12 January 2014.

The Super Final was played in Rouen, France on the 10–12 January 2014.

The points system used in this tournament was: the winner in regular time won 3 points, the loser 0 points; in case of a tie, an overtime and a penalty shootout is played, the winner in penalty shootouts or overtime won 2 points and the loser won 1 point.

First Group Stage

Group A
(Belgrade, Serbia)

Group A standings

Second Group Stage

Group B
(Nottingham, Great Britain)

Group B standings

 Tallinn Viiking-Sport, the winners of Group A didn't fly to Nottingham due to visa problems and were replaced by Group A runners-up CD Hielo Bipolo.

Group C
(Dunaújváros, Hungary)

Group C standings

Third Group Stage

Group D
(Asiago, Italy)

Group D standings

Group E
(Vojens, Denmark)

Group E standings

Final stage

Final Group
(Rouen, France)

Final Group standings

References

External links
 Official IIHF tournament page

IIHF Continental Cup
2013–14 in European ice hockey